Wormholt Park is a public park in the London Borough of Hammersmith and Fulham.

History

Origins
The park dates from the early 1900s when the Ecclesiastical Commissioners decided to sell parts of the Wormholt and Old Oak Farms for development.

Notes

External links
Friends of Wormholt Park Retrieved July 2015
Wormholt Park at the London Borough of Hammersmith & Fulham Retrieved July 2015
Wormholt Park: the first hundred years Retrieved January 2016
Parks and open spaces in the London Borough of Hammersmith and Fulham